The 2000 UC Davis football team represented the University of California, Davis as an independent during the 2000 NCAA Division II football season. Led by eighth-year head coach Bob Biggs, UC Davis compiled an overall record of 12–1. 2000 was the 31st consecutive winning season for the Aggies. UC Davis was ranked No. 1 in West Region of the NCAA Division II poll at the end of the regular season and advanced to the NCAA Division II Football Championship playoffs for the fifth straight year. The team averaged 48 points per game, outscoring their opponents 622 to 258 for the season. The Aggies played home games at Toomey Field in Davis, California.

Schedule

NFL Draft
The following UC Davis Aggies players were selected in the 2001 NFL Draft.

References

UC Davis
UC Davis Aggies football seasons
UC Davis Aggies football